

Gmina Złotoryja is a rural gmina (administrative district) in Złotoryja County, Lower Silesian Voivodeship, in south-western Poland. Its seat is the town of Złotoryja, although the town is not part of the territory of the gmina.

Neighbouring gminas
Gmina Złotoryja is bordered by the town of Złotoryja and by the gminas of Chojnów, Krotoszyce, Męcinka, Miłkowice, Pielgrzymka, Świerzawa and Zagrodno.

Villages
The gmina contains the villages of Brennik, Ernestynów, Gierałtowiec, Jerzmanice-Zdrój, Kopacz, Kozów, Łaźniki, Leszczyna, Lubiatów, Nowa Wieś Złotoryjska, Podolany, Prusice, Pyskowice, Rokitnica, Rzymówka, Sępów, Wilków, Wyskok and Wysocko.

References

Zlotoryja
Złotoryja County